Malesherbia is a genus of flowering plants consisting of 25 species in the Passifloraceae. This is a xerophytic group endemic to the Peruvian and Chilean deserts and adjacent Argentina. The genus is currently recognized by the APG III system of classification in the family Passifloraceae, and is the sole member of the subfamily Malesherbioideae.

Species 
Species accepted by the Plants of the World Online as of 2022:

 Malesherbia angustisecta 
 Malesherbia ardens 
 Malesherbia arequipensis 
 Malesherbia auristipulata 
 Malesherbia bracteata 
 Malesherbia corallina 
 Malesherbia densiflora 
 Malesherbia deserticola 
 Malesherbia fasciculata 
 Malesherbia fatimae 
 Malesherbia haemantha 
 Malesherbia humilis 
 Malesherbia lactea 
 Malesherbia laraosensis 
 Malesherbia linearifolia 
 Malesherbia lirana 
 Malesherbia paniculata 
 Malesherbia scarlatiflora 
 Malesherbia solanoides 
 Malesherbia splendens 
 Malesherbia tenuifolia 
 Malesherbia tocopillana 
 Malesherbia tubulosa 
 Malesherbia turbinea 
 Malesherbia weberbaueri

Phylogeny 

Please note, this phylogeny does not include Malesherbia laraosensis. As of 2022, a phylogenetic analysis including M. laraosensis has not been published.

References

 
Malpighiales genera